Paratha is a flatbread native to South Asia, prevalent throughout the modern-day nations of India, Sri Lanka, Pakistan, Nepal, Bangladesh, Maldives, Afghanistan, Myanmar, Malaysia, Singapore, Mauritius, Fiji, Guyana, Suriname, and Trinidad and Tobago where wheat is the traditional staple. Paratha is an amalgamation of the words parat and atta, which literally means layers of cooked dough. Alternative spellings and names include parantha, parauntha, prontha, parontay, paronthi
(Punjabi), porota (in Bengali), paratha (in Odia,Urdu, Hindi), palata (in Myanmar), porotha (in Assamese), forota (in Sylheti), farata (in Mauritius and the Maldives), roti canai, prata (in Southeast Asia), paratha, buss-up shut, oil roti (in the Anglophone Caribbean).

History 
The word paratha is derived from Sanskrit (S. पर, or परा+स्थः, or स्थितः). Recipes for various stuffed wheat puranpolis (which Achaya (2003) describes as parathas) are mentioned in Manasollasa, a 12th-century Sanskrit encyclopedia compiled by Someshvara III, a Western Chalukya king, who ruled from present-day Karnataka. References to paratha have also been mentioned by Nijjar (1968), in his book Panjāb under the Sultāns, 1000–1526 A.D. when he writes that parauthas were common with the nobility and aristocracy in the Punjab.

According to Banerji (2010), parathas are associated with Punjabi and North Indian cooking. The Punjabi method is to stuff parathas with a variety of stuffings. However, Banerji states, Mughals were also fond of parathas which gave raise to the Dhakai paratha, multilayered and flaky, taking its name from Dhaka in Bangladesh. O'Brien (2003) suggests that it is not correct to state that the Punjabi paratha was popularised in Delhi after the 1947 partition of India, as the Punjabi item was prevalent in Delhi before then.

Plain and stuffed varieties

Parathas are one of the most popular unleavened flatbreads in the Indian subcontinent, made by baking or cooking whole-wheat dough on a tava, and finishing off with shallow-frying. Parathas are thicker and more substantial than chapatis/rotis and this is either because, in the case of a plain paratha, they have been layered by coating with ghee or oil and folding repeatedly (much like the method used for puff pastry or some types of Turkish börek) using a laminated dough technique; or else because food ingredients such as mixed vegetables have been mixed in with the dough, such as potato or cauliflower, green beans, and carrots. A Rajasthani mung bean paratha uses both the layering technique together with mung dal mixed into the dough. Some so-called stuffed parathas resemble a filled pie squashed flat and shallow-fried, using two discs of dough sealed around the edges. Then by alternatively using a single disc of dough to encase a ball of filling and sealed with a series of pleats pinched into the dough around the top, they are gently flattened with the palm against the working surface before being rolled into a circle. Most stuffed parathas are not layered.

Parathas can be eaten as a breakfast dish or as a tea-time (tiffin) snack. The flour used is finely ground wholemeal (atta) and the dough is shallow-fried.

Perhaps the most common stuffing for parathas is mashed, spiced potatoes (aloo ka parantha) followed perhaps by dal (lentils). Many other alternatives exist such as leaf vegetables, radishes, cauliflower or paneer.  A paratha (especially a stuffed one) can be eaten simply with a pat of butter spread on top or with chutney, pickles, ketchup, dahi or a raita or with meat or vegetable curries. Some roll the paratha into a tube and eat it with tea, often dipping the paratha.

To achieve the  layered dough for plain parathas, a number of different traditional techniques exist. These include covering the thinly rolled out pastry with oil, folding back and forth like a paper fan and coiling the resulting strip into a round shape before rolling flat, baking on the tava and shallow frying. Another method is to cut a circle of dough from the centre to its circumference along its radius, oiling the dough and starting at the cut edge rolling so as to form a cone which is then squashed into a disc shape and rolled out. The method of oiling and repeatedly folding the dough as in western puff pastry also exists, and this is combined with folding patterns that give traditional geometrical shapes to the finished parathas.  Plain parathas can be round, heptagonal, square, or triangular.

Serving 

The paratha is an important part of a traditional breakfast from the Indian subcontinent. Traditionally, it is made using ghee but oil is also used. Some people may even bake it in the oven for health reasons. Usually, the paratha is eaten with dollops of white butter on top of it. Side dishes which go very well with paratha are curd, fried egg, omelette, mutton kheema (ground mutton cooked with vegetables and spices), nihari (a lamb dish), jeera aloo (potatoes lightly fried with cumin seeds), daal, and raita as part of a breakfast meal. It may be stuffed with potatoes, paneer, onions, qeema or chili peppers.

Types 

 Aloo paratha (stuffed with spicy boiled potato and onions mix).
 Chili parotha or mirchi paratha (small, spicy shredded pieces)
 Gobi paratha (stuffed with flavoured cauliflower)
 Mughlai paratha (a deep-fried stuffed paratha filled with egg and minced meat from Bangladesh and West Bengal of India)
 Murthal Paratha, deep-fried, Dhabas of Haryana and specially at Murthal on Grand Trunk Road are famous for this
 Roti prata (Singapore)
 Roti canai (Malaysia)
 Buss-up-shut (Trinidad; the name is Trinidadian Creole for "busted-up shirt", for the resemblance of the shreddy bread to ragged old clothes)

See also 

 Gali Paranthe Wali
 Roti canai, a variant from Southeast Asia
 Cōng yóu bǐng, a similar Chinese flatbread stuffed with minced scallions
 Parotta
 Naan
 List of bread dishes
 List of Indian breads

References 

Balochi cuisine
Bengali cuisine
Bangladeshi cuisine
Bihari cuisine
Burmese cuisine
Flatbreads
Pakistani breads
Indian breads
Indian cuisine
Kashmiri cuisine
Nepalese cuisine
Pashtun cuisine
Punjabi cuisine
Fijian cuisine
Sindhi cuisine
Trinidad and Tobago cuisine
Unleavened breads
Uttar Pradeshi cuisine
Articles containing video clips
Stuffed dishes